Torpedo Fire is a turn-based submarine warfare game written by John Lyon for the Apple II and published by Strategic Simulations in 1981.

Gameplay
Torpedo Fire is a game in which a submarine attack against a convoy is simulated. It is designed for two players, each turn covering 60 seconds of simulation time.

Reception
Forrest Johnson reviewed Torpedo Fire in The Space Gamer No. 41. Johnson commented that "I cannot help but feel that Strategic Simulations has taken a wrong turn somewhere. I hope they find their way again soon." In Video Games, Rich Sutton said playability concerns meant that he "only recommended [Torpedo Fire] for the advanced player who desires the most accurate simulation on the market".

Bob Proctor, in a detailed analysis for Computer Gaming World, concluded "Although extremely well conceived, the concepts could have been better implemented. "

Reviews
Video Games

Legacy
In early 1982, designer Gary Grigsby got his break in the game industry when he called Strategic Simulations' hotline with a question about Torpedo Fire, which he owned a copy of at the time. Getting into a conversation with company head Joel Billings paved the way for SSI's release of Grigsby's title Guadalcanal Campaign.

References

1981 video games
Apple II games
Apple II-only games
Strategic Simulations games
Submarine simulation video games
Turn-based strategy video games
Video games developed in the United States